Josephine or Josie Richards may refer to:

Josephine Richards (Mormon), Mormon leader and suffragist
Josephine Richards, author of "A Halloween Story" in For a Few Stories More
Josie Richards, Miss Trinidad and Tobago Universe

See also
Jo Richards (disambiguation)